Waskasoo Creek is a creek that is mostly in Red Deer, Alberta but also passes through Penhold, Alberta after Innisfail, Alberta. The creek empties into the Red Deer River.  Significant stretches of the creek were straightened in the 1970s to alleviate flooding.

See also 
 List of rivers of Alberta

Tributaries
Piper Creek

References

Red Deer, Alberta
Rivers of Alberta